Kaddouri (derived from "green", akhdar in Arabic;   (transliterated; does not mean green, which would be ירוק, yarok)) and many other transliterations, is an Arabic surname. People with the surname include:

 Badr El Kaddouri (born 1981), Moroccan footballer
 Elie Kedourie (1926–1992), British historian
 Majid Khadduri (1909-2007), Iraqi academic
 Omar El Kaddouri (born 1990), Belgian footballer
 Sylvia Kedourie (1925–2016), British historian

Others
 Kadoorie family,  Mizrahi Jewish family originally from Baghdad, then Bombay, Shanghai, and finally Hong Kong
 Ellis Kadoorie (1865–1922), philanthropist and businessman
 Kadoorie Agricultural High School and youth village in Israel, founded by Sir Ellis Kadoorie
 Palestine Technical University - Kadoorie, the Arab twin institution of the Jewish Kadoorie Agricultural School
 Elly Kadoorie (1867–1944), philanthropist and businessman
 Lawrence Kadoorie, Baron Kadoorie (1899–1993), industrialist, hotelier
 Horace Kadoorie (1902–1995), industrialist, hotelier, and philanthropist
 Kadoorie Farm and Botanic Garden, a farm and bontanic garden in Hong Kong established by Lawrence and Horace Kadoorie.
 Michael Kadoorie (b. 1941), businessman and philanthropist
 Yitzhak Kaduri (died 2006),  Mizrahi Haredi rabbi and kabbalist

Arabic-language surnames